The women's 400 metres hurdles event at the 2014 World Junior Championships in Athletics was held in Eugene, Oregon, USA, at Hayward Field on 24, 25 and 26 July.

Medalists

Records

Results

Final
26 July
Start time: 16:08  Temperature: 30 °C  Humidity: 31 %

Semifinals
25 July
First 2 in each heat (Q) and the next 2 fastest (q) advance to the Final

Summary

Details
First 2 in each heat (Q) and the next 2 fastest (q) advance to the Final

Semifinal 1
26 July
Start time: 19:06  Temperature: 28 °C  Humidity: 33%

Semifinal 2
26 July
Start time: 19:14  Temperature: 27 °C  Humidity: 37%

Semifinal 3
26 July
Start time: 19:21  Temperature: 27 °C  Humidity: 37%

Heats
24 July
First 4 in each heat (Q) and the next 4 fastest (q) advance to the Semi-Finals

Summary

Details
First 4 in each heat (Q) and the next 4 fastest (q) advance to the Semi-Finals

Heat 1
26 July
Start time: 12:44  Temperature: 21 °C  Humidity: 53%

Heat 2
26 July
Start time: 12:50  Temperature: 21 °C  Humidity: 53%

Heat 3
26 July
Start time: 12:56  Temperature: 21 °C  Humidity: 53%

Heat 4
26 July
Start time: 13:02  Temperature: 21 °C  Humidity: 53%

Heat 5
26 July
Start time: 13:08  Temperature: 21 °C  Humidity: 53%

Participation
According to an unofficial count, 36 athletes from 27 countries participated in the event.

References

External links
 WJC14 5000 metres schedule

400 metres hurdles
400 metres hurdles at the World Athletics U20 Championships
2014 in women's athletics